Alex Seaver, better known by his stage name Mako, is an American music producer and DJ from Los Angeles. The project Mako originally started as a duo with producer Logan Light, who left the group in 2017. Mako rose to prominence in the electronic dance music scene from their single "Beam", which was remixed by Dannic on Revealed Recordings and played at festivals worldwide.

Career

2011: Formation of Mako 
Before an introduction was made, the two artists spent their early life progressing musically in different worlds. Both members' fathers were paired as roommates at Syracuse University and were good friends.

Logan Light, who was part of Mako, went to Columbia University in New York City before heading for the University of Michigan. He attended the university, majored in communications and graduated in 2011. While his parents were reluctant to accept his career choice (of DJing), they eventually lent Light some money so that he could buy some DJ equipment such as turntables to play at parties. His career blew up when he started to book gigs and associate with world-known DJs like Above & Beyond and Zedd. Within only several years, Light had opened for some of dance music's biggest international acts, including Tiesto and Avicii.

Seaver attended The Juilliard School on full scholarship as musician. Having played with some of the world's elite classical artists in the most storied of venues, he knew he was destined for an unusual path. Upon graduating school in New York City, Seaver moved to Los Angeles after being selected for the ASCAP scholarship workshop for scoring music to film and television. He is also a singer-songwriter and regularly contributes vocals to Mako's songs.

Mako was formed after the 2011 Electric Daisy Carnival when Light invited to Seaver to "witness his world".

Light spoke of Seaver in an interview, saying "Thankfully, Alex has the brain of a musical genius. He hates when I say this, but he probably is the most talented musical person I've ever met. And none of what we do would be possible without him. I mean he's the brain of it all, and I'm lucky to be along for the ride. Musical composition is his world, and every once in a while I add my two cents and he says, 'Oh that's smart,' but that's his cup of tea, not mine."

Since their start, Mako has built a working relationship with Interscope Records, quickly finding themselves in studio with some of EDM's top artists such as Avicii, Sander van Doorn, R3hab, DubVision and many others. Mako's first label release, "Into the Light" featuring Sander van Doorn was released on Dutch label Spinnin' Records. It reached number 3 on the Beatport Top 100 chart in one week and remained in the top 5 for over two weeks.

2013–2015: Debut single with Sander van Doorn 
On May 13, 2013, Mako released their debut single with Sander van Doorn and DubVision titled "Into the Light" featuring Mariana Bell. An official music video was uploaded on Spinnin' Records' YouTube channel nine days later.

On December 16, 2013, they released "Beam" as a single which was mixed by Dannic. An official music video for the song was uploaded by Revealed Recordings' YouTube channel three days later.

On August 12, 2014, they released a single titled "Our Story" along with an official music video on YouTube uploaded by Ultra Records. A remixes EP of the song was also released.

On February 24, 2015, they released "I Won't Let You Walk Away" featuring Madison Beer. An official music video was uploaded on the same day.

On August 14, 2015, they released "Smoke Filled Room" as a single via Ultra Records. Later, they released a remixes' single of the song along with an acoustic version and two more remixes. An official music video of the song was uploaded by Ultra Records' YouTube channel five months later. An official music video for the acoustic version was also released by Ultra Records.

Mako featured in Steve Angello's song titled "Children of the Wild". A music video was uploaded on Steve Angello's YouTube channel.

2016–present: Debut album and departure of Light 
On April 21, 2016, "Into The Sunset" was released as a single on YouTube. On October 25, 2016, Mako announced that their debut upcoming album, "Hourglass". On November 19, 2016, they released the single "Let Go Of The Wheel".

On December 9, 2016, they released their debut studio album, "Hourglass" via Ultra Records.

On March 6, 2017, Light shared a handwritten note that stated he would be taking a break from touring with Mako during 2017, leaving Seaver as a solo act (with a backing back) on their tour that year. At some point during the year after the announcement, Mako officially became a solo act, with Seaver releasing "Breathe" in December as a solo artist.

In an interview on January 26, 2018, Alex Seaver discussed the details of Logan Light leaving the group. "What actually happened was he was in law school for the last couple years, killed it, passed the bar, and then got a huge offer at an amazing firm. The dynamic between us was so different than most people. I actually made all the music, all the way back from 'Beam' until now, and then he would meet me on weekends and be kind of the leader of the DJ set. So he would prepare the set, I would write all the music, and then at almost the right moment, his life took off in a different direction while I started making other stuff other than dance music."

On February 13, 2018, a collaboration between Kill the Noise, Illenium and Mako, titled "Don't Give Up on Me", was released as single via Proximity. The song was initially leaked in the Reddit community by fans who revealed the link to the then-unreleased version of the song that was published on Mako's YouTube channel.

Discography

Studio albums

Singles

As lead artist

As featured artist

Remixes

Production credits

References

Notes 
 A  Did not enter the Ultratop 50, but peaked on the Dance Bubbling Under chart.

Sources

External links 
 

American DJs
American house musicians
American electronic musicians
Living people
Progressive house musicians
University of Michigan College of Literature, Science, and the Arts alumni
Revealed Recordings artists
Spinnin' Records artists
Ultra Records artists
Electronic dance music DJs
Year of birth missing (living people)